Betsy Layne is a census-designated place (CDP) and coal town in Floyd County, Kentucky, United States. It was established in 1875 along the Levisa Fork. The post office opened on May 1, 1908, with Clayton S. Hitchins as postmaster. Its ZIP code is 41605. The 2010 census reported the population to be 688. Stage actress Bette Henritze (born 1924) was a native of Betsy Layne.

Betsy Layne is located along the eastern border of Floyd County at  (37.5514880, -82.6334884) and at an elevation of 650 ft (198 m). It is bordered to the east by Pike County. U.S. Route 23 passes through the community, leading northwest  to Prestonsburg and southeast  to Pikeville.

In addition to being treated as a census-designated place by the United States Census Bureau, they also consider Betsy Layne and the nearby community of Stanville as a combined Census County Division (CCD). It had a population of 4,601 at the 2020 census. The CCD also includes the communities of Banner, Dana, Harold, Ivel and Tram.

Demographics

Notable people
 Natasha Cornett – murderer sentenced to life imprisonment for the Lillelid murders

References

Census-designated places in Floyd County, Kentucky
Census-designated places in Kentucky
Populated places established in 1875
Coal towns in Kentucky
1875 establishments in Kentucky